Results and Statistics of the 2005 Claxton Shield

Results

Round 1: Saturday, 22 January 2005

Round 2: Sunday, 23 January 2005

Round 3: Monday, 24 January 2005

Round 4: Tuesday, 25 January 2005

Round 5: Wednesday, 26 January 2005

Round 2 Make-up: Thursday, 27 January 2005
Games 1 and 2 on 23 January were rained out, so a make up round was called.

Ladder

Finals

Semi-finals

Grand final

External links
 Official 2005 Claxton Shield Website

Claxton Shield
Claxton Shield
January 2005 sports events in Australia